The white-necked babbler (Stachyris leucotis) is a species of bird in the family Timaliidae. It is found in Brunei, Indonesia, Malaysia, and Thailand. Its natural habitat is subtropical or tropical moist lowland forest. It is threatened by habitat loss.

References

Collar, N. J. & Robson, C. 2007. Family Timaliidae (Babblers)  pp. 70 – 291 in; del Hoyo, J., Elliott, A. & Christie, D.A. eds. Handbook of the Birds of the World, Vol. 12. Picathartes to Tits and Chickadees. Lynx Edicions, Barcelona.

Stachyris
Birds of the Malay Peninsula
Birds of Malaysia
Birds of Brunei
Birds of Sumatra
Birds of Borneo
Birds described in 1848
Taxonomy articles created by Polbot